Spaniards in the Philippines may refer to either:
the Spanish colonial presence in the country; or,
Spanish-Filipino (disambiguation).